The Provident Institution for Savings (est.1816) in Boston, Massachusetts, was the first chartered savings bank in the United States.  James Savage and others founded the bank on the belief that "savings banks would enable the less fortunate classes of society to better themselves in a manner which would avoid the dangers of moral corruption traditionally associated with outright charitable institutions."

History

19th century

"The leading citizens of Boston ... felt that participation in the administration of the savings banks in their [city] was an integral part of their civic duties." Led by Savage, founders of the bank included William Ellery Channing, William Cochran, Thomas Dawes, Samuel Eliot, Jonathan Hunnewell, John Phillips, William Phillips, Jesse Putnam, Josiah Quincy, Richard Sullivan, Elisha Ticknor, Redford Webster. Boston's Catholic bishop, John Cheverus, provided significant start-up energy, since a savings bank would encourage virtuous thrifty behavior amongst his parishioners. Early meetings took place in the Exchange Coffee House. They agreed the "object of the institution" was "to provide a safe and profitable mode of enabling industrious persons of all descriptions to invest such parts of their earnings or property, as they can conveniently spare, in a manner which will afford them both profit and security.

In the first decades of its history, the Provident occupied several buildings in downtown Boston -- Court Street (ca.1817), in the courthouse; Scollay Square (1823–1833), in Scollay's building; Tremont Street (1833–1856), adjacent to King's Chapel Burying Ground; and Temple Place (beginning in 1856), in the former mansion of Thomas Handasyd Perkins.

At first, only people who lived in Boston or Charlestown were admitted as depositors. In 1822, the bank expanded its client base to include depositors from "Quincy, Milton, Dorchester, Dedham, Roxbury, Brookline, Waltham, Brighton, Newton, Weston, Cambridge, Watertown, West Cambridge, Medford, Saugus, Malden, and Chelsea." Although the Provident operated as a bank, in its early years it avoided the word "bank" "for the purpose of avoiding a certain sentiment of antipathy, which, at the time, appeared to be entertained toward the existing 'banks' by the common people." The amount of deposits increased dramatically through the years: deposits in 1820 totaled $233,034; in 1830, $986,959; in 1840, $2,071,095; and by 1900, $38,629,876.

Into the 19th century, the Provident's early spirit of civic benevolence and socio-economic inclusion may have diminished. According to one historian, the bank "sought large deposits, made timely loans to textile firms in which its directors were interested, and generally profiteered."

20th century
In 1986 the Hartford National Corp. bought the Provident Institution for Savings in Boston for $87.2 million. "The Provident became a wholly owned subsidiary of Hartford National. However, The Provident, which is the fourth-largest savings bank in Massachusetts, will continue to operate under the name it has been using since 1816." The bank kept its original name through 1992. In 1993, the Provident was merged into Shawmut Bank.

Images

References

Further reading
 
 
 

1816 establishments in Massachusetts
19th century in Boston
Bank of America
Economic history of Boston
Former buildings and structures in Boston
Banks based in Massachusetts